Brilliant may refer to:

Music
Brilliant (album), a 2012 album by Ultravox
Brilliant (band), a British pop/rock group active in the 1980s
"Brilliant" (song), a song by D'espairsRay
Brilliant Classics, Dutch classical music record label
Brilliant!, a 1989 album by Kym Mazelle

Places
Brilliant, British Columbia, a community in Canada
Brilliant, Alabama, a town in the U.S.
Brilliant, New Mexico
Brilliant, Ohio, a town in the U.S.

Ships
Brilliant (schooner), a schooner at Mystic Seaport in Mystic, Connecticut

 – one of nine vessels by that name
 – one of two vessels by that name

Other uses
Brilliant.org, an educational website
Brilliant (diamond cut)
brilliant (typography), the typographic size between diamond and excelsior
Brilliant (film), a 2004 TV film
Brilliant!, 1995/96 art show of Young British Artists in Minneapolis and Houston
The Fast Show or Brilliant!, a BBC series
Brilliant, a 1950s cartoon character in the Dick Tracy comic strip
Brilliant, several species of hummingbirds in the genus Heliodoxa.

People with the name
Ashleigh Brilliant (born 1933), author and syndicated cartoonist 
Fredda Brilliant (1903–1999), Polish sculptor and actress
Larry Brilliant, American physician, epidemiologist, technologist, and author
Brilliant Dadashova, Azerbaijani pop singer

See also
Brillant (disambiguation)
Brilliance (disambiguation)
Brilliancy (chess)